Rachel Shabi is a British journalist and author. She is a contributing writer to The Guardian and the author of Not the Enemy, Israel's Jews from Arab Lands.

Early life
Born in Israel to Iraqi Jewish parents in Ramat Gan, Shabi grew up in the UK. She studied politics and literature at the University of Edinburgh.

Career
Shabi is a journalist based in the UK, having also reported from the Middle East including on the Israeli–Palestinian conflict and from Tunisia and Egypt. As well as focusing on the Middle East, she writes on issues such as progressive politics, the far right, counter-extremism and migration. She is also the author of a book and regularly appears as a commentator on international news channels.

Shabi has written for publications including The Guardian, The New York Times, the London Times, The Independent, Al Jazeera English, Foreign Policy, Prospect and the New Statesman.

Her book, Not the Enemy: Israel's Jews from Arab Lands, was published in 2009. In the work, Shabi argued that Israel has discriminated against and culturally stripped its population of Jews from Arab and Muslim countries. The book received a National Jewish Book Award.

Shabi was shortlisted for the 2011 Orwell journalism prize and was a joint winner in the Press Category of the Anna Lindh Journalist Award for reporting across cultures (for her article "We were looking for a nice, peaceful place near Jerusalem", published by The Guardian) the same year. In 2013, Shabi won the International Media Awards' Cutting Edge Media award.

In September 2017, Iain Dale placed Shabi at No. 30 on his list of 'The 100 Most Influential People on the Left', up sixty places on his previous listing, noting that, "Omnipresent on our screens, the redoubtable Shabi is one of the few Corbyn supporting commentators to be taken seriously by the media. Thoughtful and fluent, she deserves her massive rise in this year's list."

Shabi identifies as an Arab Jew and has lamented the stigmatisation of Arab-Jewish culture in Israel.

Bibliography
 We Look Like the Enemy: The Hidden Story of Israel's Jews from Arab Lands, Bloomsbury Publishing 2009.

References

1973 births
Arab journalists
Living people
British journalists
British Jewish writers
British people of Iraqi-Jewish descent
British Jews
Israeli emigrants to the United Kingdom
The Guardian journalists
Alumni of the University of Edinburgh
People from Ramat Gan
Israeli Arab Jews
British women journalists
Jewish women writers